Ra'Shaad Samples (born December 11, 1994) is an American football coach who is currently the Passing Game Coordinator and Wide Receivers coach at Arizona State University. He previously served as running backs coach for the Los Angeles Rams. A native of Dallas, Texas, he has established himself as one of top college football recruiters of the Dallas–Fort Worth area. He previously served as the assistant head coach at SMU for 2 seasons (2019-2021).

Playing career 
Samples was a former four-star wide receiver at Oklahoma State who later transferred to play at Houston. His playing career was cut short when he was forced to medically retire due to suffering a number of concussions.

Coaching career
Samples remained with Houston as a student assistant before joining former Houston coach Tom Herman's staff at Texas in 2018 as an assistant wide receivers coach.

SMU
Samples was hired as an offensive assistant at SMU in 2019, serving as the program's top recruiter rather coaching a position. He was officially promoted to running backs coach and recruiting coordinator in 2020, and was promoted to assistant head coach in 2021.

Los Angeles Rams
On November 29, 2021, Samples was announced as the assistant head coach and running backs coach for TCU, joining new head coach Sonny Dykes. However he left for the NFL to become the Los Angeles Rams running backs coach for the 2022 season.

Arizona State

On December 9, 2022, Samples announced he was leaving the Rams to return to college as the Passing Game Coordinator and Wide Receivers coach at Arizona State for the 2023 season.

References

External links 
 
 SMU Mustangs profile
 Arizona State profile

1994 births
Living people
Sportspeople from Dallas
Players of American football from Dallas
Coaches of American football from Texas
American football wide receivers
Oklahoma State Cowboys football players
Houston Cougars football players
Houston Cougars football coaches
Texas Longhorns football coaches
SMU Mustangs football coaches
Los Angeles Rams coaches